is a Japanese kabuki actor, the apprentice and the adopted son to Nakamura Baigyoku IV.

He was first exposed to kabuki when his parents, both of whom work in the publishing industry, brought him to see a play when he was three years old. At age six, he was first introduced to Nakamura Baigyoku, and began helping out backstage at the theatre.

Taken under Baigyoku's wing, he first appeared on stage in 2005, under his birth name, in the role of Tōgashi's page in a production of Kanjinchō.
and at the same time he officially became the "heya-go" apprentice to Baigyoku, was granted his kabuki stage-name "Nakamura Umemaru" in 2006.

In 2019, it is announced that Baigyoku will adopt Umemaru and grow to be his successor, then change the stage name to be "Kangyoku". the part "gyoku" derived from Baigyoku, and "Kan" means "buds" which derived from Baigyoku's adoptive father Nakamura Utaemon VI's self produced theatre programme, 莟会（tsubomi-kai）(the name Baigyoku's "Bai" means "plum" (blossom) on the other hand).

See also
  Nakamura Kanzaburō

References

1996 births
Kabuki actors
Living people